The Thames Valley is an informally-defined sub-region of South East England, centred on the River Thames west of London, with Oxford as a major centre. Its boundaries vary with context. The area is a major tourist destination and economic hub, includes part of the M4 corridor, and is sometimes referred to as England's Silicon Valley due to the concentration of high-technology companies.  The area east of Reading is defined by Natural England as the Thames Valley National Character Area, while Thames Valley Police cover the counties of Berkshire, Buckinghamshire and Oxfordshire.

Geography 
As a National Character Area, the Thames Valley is bounded to the west by Reading, fanning out roughly in a wedge shape towards the fringes of London. It contains 38 Sites of Special Scientific Interest and significant amounts of broadleaf forest, including Burnham Beeches, Windsor Great Park and Richmond Park.

Economy
The Thames Valley is a technology hub centred around Reading, considered to stretch as far out as Swindon, Oxford and Slough. It is considered to be part of the M4 corridor.

Tourism 
As a tourist destination, the Thames Valley is considered to be the area close to the River Thames, running from the source to the M25 motorway. It is a popular boating destination.

Policing
Thames Valley Police cover the counties of Berkshire, Buckinghamshire and Oxfordshire. The force is governed by the Thames Valley Police and Crime Commissioner.

See also
Diocese of Oxford
Three Counties
South Midlands

References

Geography of the River Thames
Natural regions of England